Svalbard Ekspressen is a Svalbard-themed roller coaster located at Kongeparken, Ålgård, Norway. The coaster's background story tells of a polar bear (Sam) who runs away from the coal mines in Svalbard to come to the park. It is a family roller coaster manufactured by Vekoma.

References

Roller coasters in Norway
2000 establishments in Norway